Canoe Lake Cree First Nation ( nêhiyaw-wapâsihk) is a Cree First Nation based in the settlement of Canoe Narrows, Saskatchewan. The Nation is a member of Meadow Lake Tribal Council Tribal Council.

Their reserves include:
 Canoe Lake 165A
 Canoe Lake 165B
 Eagles Lake 165C
 Onikahp Sahghikansis 165E
 Roadside 165F
 Wepuskow Sahgaiechan 165D

References

 

First Nations in Saskatchewan